Matteo Berrettini defeated Cameron Norrie in the final, 6–4, 6–7(5–7), 6–3, to win the singles tennis title at the 2021 Queen's Club Championships. Berrettini's win earned him his fourth career ATP Tour singles title, his first ATP 500 victory, and also made him the first player to win the tournament on their main draw debut since Boris Becker in 1985. Norrie was contesting for his first title in his fourth career final.

Feliciano López was the defending champion from when the event was last held in 2019, but he lost in the second round to Denis Shapovalov.

Seeds

Draw

Finals

Top half

Bottom half

Qualifying

Seeds

Qualifiers

Lucky loser

Qualifying draw

First qualifier

Second qualifier

Third qualifier

Fourth qualifier

References

External links
Main draw
Qualifying draw
Official website
ATP Tour website

Singles
2021 ATP Tour
2021 sports events in London
Que
June 2021 sports events in the United Kingdom